Suzanne Oboler is a Peruvian-American scholar and Professor of Latin American and Latina/o Studies at the John Jay College of Criminal Justice of the City University of New York.

Oboler is the author of Ethnic Labels, Latino Lives: Identity and the Politics of (Re)Presentation in the United States and the founding Editor of the journal Latino Studies (2002-2012). She has edited several books, including Latinos and Citizenship: The Dilemma of Belonging; Behind Bars: Latino/as and Prison in the United States (2006), and co-edited Neither Enemies nor Friends: Latinos, Blacks, Afro-Latinos (2009). Oboler is also co-Editor in Chief of The Oxford Encyclopedia of Latino/as in the United States.

References

Latin Americanists
Living people
John Jay College of Criminal Justice faculty
Year of birth missing (living people)
American people of Peruvian descent
American print editors
Place of birth missing (living people)
American social sciences writers